Warczewiczella amazonica is a species of orchid native to Colombia, Ecuador, Peru, and Brazil.

References

External links 
 

amazonica
Epiphytic orchids
Orchids of South America